Walter Zimper (29 April 1942 in Markt Piesting, Lower Austria; 13 January 2008 in Sankt Pölten) was an Austrian politician of the ÖVP.

Zimper studied at the Trading Academy at the University of Vienna. He was editor-in-chief of the Niederösterreichischen Volksblattes.

Since 1970, he was part of the Gemeinderat in Markt Piesting and was from 1975 to 2002 mayor of the community.  From 1980 to 1982 Zimper was secretary of the Lower Austria ÖVP. Due to his alleged involvement in the WBO scandal, he had to resign from the office. 

From 1999 to 2007, he was Vice President of the Austrian Association of Municipalities. From 1974 until 1982 Zimper was a member of the Lower Austrian parliament.

External links
 Biography 
 "Walter Zimper ist tot"

1942 births
2008 deaths
Austrian People's Party politicians